= Dingletown Church =

Coordinates: 41.08829°N 73.60125°W

- Dingletown Community Church
- Dingletown Church
- Location: 376 Stanwich Road; Greenwich, Connecticut
- Country: United States
- Denomination: Nondenominational
- Website: www.dingletown.org (inactive)

History
- Founded: 1845
- Founder(s): James Jarman; William Ferris; David Johns; Gideon Lounsbury

Dingletown Church (also referred to as Dingletown Community Church) is a nondenominational church in Greenwich, Connecticut. Founded in 1845, the building frame is believed to be the oldest in Greenwich. The church sits in its current location since 1959, after it was moved to the corner of Stanwich Road/Barnstable Lane.

== History ==
Dingletown Church was built around on the corner of Dingletown Road in 1845. The name is believed to refer the tickling of the bells worn by the cows grazing on the nearby farmlands. The land for the church was already sold in 1839 by Henry Lockwood to the church founders James Jarman, William Ferris, David Johns and Gideon Lounsbury, keeping an interest himself, and therefore becoming a member of the church founders. Since 1957, the church operates as an incorporated association. In 2011, the church received exterior renovations.
